Andrew 'Andy' Rankine Taylor (born 8 February 1955) is a Scottish former cricketer.

Taylor was born at Bridge of Allan in February 1955. A club cricketer for Carlton, he made a single appearance for Scotland in a List A one-day match against Warwickshire at Edgbaston in the 1982 Benson & Hedges Cup. He was dismissed without scoring by Gladstone Small, while with the ball he bowled two wicketless overs with his right-arm medium-fast bowling.

References

External links
 

1955 births
Living people
People from Bridge of Allan
Scottish cricketers